The Estádio Municipal de Aveiro is a football stadium in Aveiro, Portugal. It was designed for the UEFA Euro 2004 tournament by Portuguese architect Tomás Taveira. It has a capacity of 32,830 spectators, making it the fifth largest football stadium in Portugal.

Amongst the most notable football games at the venue are two matches of the UEFA Euro 2004 championship, five matches of the Portugal national team, and eleven matches of the Supertaça Cândido de Oliveira (Portuguese Super Cup).

Design
Estádio Municipal de Aveiro Stadium has an ambitious design that combines a simple and endearing shape with a liveliness of colours of every kind throughout the entire stadium. Therefore, the stadium conveys a sensation of jolliness that has a positive effect on the celebration of sports events. It was the intuition of architect Tomás Taveira to introduce intense tonality colours to the exterior of the stadium and to subsequently give a feeling of motion and a spectacular visual effect. Therefore, the stadium resembles a big toy for children with lots a coloured parts gathered together.

The stadium's polychromy and dynamism is also reflected on the interior where four tribunes contain a curvilinear profile and multicoloured seats that characterize the stadium. The seats have different colours that are distributed in a random way. Red, green, yellow, blue, white, and black seats offer an original and chromatic animation and a strong feeling of dynamism and cheerfulness - even when the stadium is empty it looks as if the party has already started. Different colours are used in the stadium details, from the entrance gates, to the pillars and supporting beams. Even the walls at the inner ambience are coloured.

The roof also contributes to the harmonization process by making the stadium look like a big toy. It contains sharply red steel pylons that uphold sky-blue edges. From a more formal point of view, the slightly waved roof unifies the curved course of the underlying tribunes that offer a view over the pylons and its steel tie-beams.

UEFA Euro 2004
The following UEFA Euro 2004 - Group D - matches were held in the stadium:

Portugal national football team
The following national team matches were held in the stadium.

Supertaça Cândido de Oliveira finals
The following Portuguese Super Cup finals took place at this stadium:

References

External links
Official website
WorldStadiums profile
Fussballtempel profile

UEFA Euro 2004 stadiums
Municipal de Aveiro
S.C. Beira-Mar
Sports venues in Aveiro District
Sports venues completed in 2003